is a Japanese voice actress and singer. Her talent agency is Arts Vision.

Notable voice roles
 Ultimate Girls – Moroboshi Tsubomi
 Canvas 2 – Kana Hagino
 Heat Guy J – Vivian
 Kiddy Grade – Viola
 Les Misérables: Shōjo Cosette – Hugues
 Fatal Fury – Nakokuru
 Magical Play – Padudu
 Pita-Ten – Miku
 UFO Baby – Pepo
 GA Geijutsuka Art Design Class – Noda Miki
 Pandora Hearts – Ada Vessalius (Drama CD)

References

External links
 
 

1977 births
Japanese voice actresses
Living people
Voice actresses from Fukuoka Prefecture
Musicians from Fukuoka Prefecture
21st-century Japanese actresses
21st-century Japanese women singers
21st-century Japanese singers
Arts Vision voice actors